Gregory Artus Frank (born May 4, 1979), also known as Frank Artus, is a Liberian  actor, director, and producer in the West African film industries.

Early life and education

Frank was born in Montserrado County, Liberia. His nationality is Liberian. He attended college at AME University in Monrovia, obtaining a degree in Human Resources Management.

Career
Frank began his career in Liberia. Shortly afterwards, he branched out to Ghana where he worked at Venus Films, then eventually moved on to shoot movies in Nigeria (Nollywood).  After acting in minor roles in Liberia, Artus wrote, directed, and starred in the movie Juetey (Children's Business).  In 2008, Jutey won six awards including best writer, best supporting actress, and movie of the year. Juetey was Frank's first attempt at screenwriting.

Since then he has filmed more than 100 movies. He has been nominated for many awards, and won the Best International Actor award for 2012 at the African Academy Awards.  He also won the Hall of Grace Award 2013. One of his best-known films is 2012's Order of the Ring, in which he performed in the nude.
  
In 2015 Frank was presented with the Face of Africa Award as a well-known actor. He also received several awards, including the Humanitarian Figure Award from the Continental Award Committee for his contributions to the fight against ebola.

Personal
Frank is married to his childhood sweetheart Prima Cooper Frank and the couple currently has three kids, two  girls and a boy who he named after his mentor, Indian actor Shah Rukh Khan.

Selected filmography

References

External links

Living people
People from Montserrado County
Liberian male film actors
1979 births